The Philippine House Special Committee on Land Use is a special committee of the Philippine House of Representatives.

Jurisdiction 
As prescribed by House Rules, the committee's jurisdiction is on land use issues which includes the following:
 Enhancement of resource use and management of indigenous cultural communities
 Land valuation regulation
 Preservation of historical and cultural heritage sites
 Public-private partnership as well as linkages among national and local agencies and stakeholders in land resource management

Members, 18th Congress

See also 
 House of Representatives of the Philippines
 List of Philippine House of Representatives committees

References

External links 
House of Representatives of the Philippines

Land Use